Agrahara, Malur  is a village in the southern state of Karnataka, India. It is located in the Malur taluk of Kolar district in Karnataka.

See also
 Kolar
 Districts of Karnataka

References

External links
 http://Kolar.nic.in/

Villages in Kolar district